Wilma Jeanne Cooper (October 25, 1928 – May 8, 2013) was an American actress, best known for her role as Katherine Chancellor on the CBS soap opera The Young and the Restless (1973–2013). At the time of her death, she was eighth on the all-time list of longest-serving soap opera actors in the United States. She also guest starred as an episode's leading lady in dozens of television series in the 1950s and 1960s. She was the mother of three children, the eldest being actor Corbin Bernsen.

Early life
Jeanne Cooper was born in Taft, California, the youngest of three children of Albert Troy Cooper and his wife, the former Sildeth Evelyn Moore. The family lived in Kern County for several years, first in Taft until 1942 and then in Bakersfield. Her mother died on August 21, 1944, the year before Jeanne graduated from Taft Union High School, Her father lived for several more decades, dying on April 11, 1986.

Career

Film and television work
Cooper began her acting career in the 1950s, performing initially as a supporting player in films with stars like Maureen O'Hara, Glenn Ford, Tony Curtis, and Henry Fonda. Her first film role was as Myra in the 1953 western film, The Redhead from Wyoming. She later appeared in small roles in The Man from the Alamo, Over-Exposed, 5 Steps to Danger, Rock All Night, House of Women, 13 West Street, The Intruder, Black Zoo, The Glory Guys, Tony Rome, The Boston Strangler and Kansas City Bomber.

Cooper was a fixture on episodic television throughout the 1950s and 1970s. In 1956, she was cast as Mrs. Hinton in "The Rabbi Davis Story" of the religious anthology series, Crossroads. That same year, she portrayed Louise Douglas in "Girl Bandit" of Broderick Crawford's syndicated crime drama, Highway Patrol. She also appeared in the Wagon Train episode titled "The Whipping" and as Marie Conover in the 1957 Cheyenne episode titled "Top Hand" starring Clint Walker.

Cooper played Ann Dix in the 1955 episode "I Am Joaquin" of the syndicated western anthology series, Death Valley Days, hosted by Stanley Andrews. In the storyline, Ann searches with ultimate success for eight years for the return of her young daughter whom the Mexican bandit Joaquin Murrieta (Cliff Fields) left at a Roman Catholic church after he boarded a ship and stabbed to death the girl's father, Capt. Stephen Dix, played by John Damler.

In 1957, she starred in one of the early episodes of two different western series, NBC's Tales of Wells Fargo starring Dale Robertson, in the role of the woman bandit Belle Starr, and two episodes on ABC’s Maverick; in 1959, she portrayed Duchess in a second Tales of Wells Fargo episode, "Clay Allison". In 1958, she was cast in the episode "Wheel of Fortune" of the NBC western series, Jefferson Drum, starring Jeff Richards as a newspaper publisher. Also in 1958, Cooper appeared as Lucy in the "Sundown at Bitter Creek" episode of the CBS western anthology series, Dick Powell's Zane Grey Theatre. She guest starred in Wanted Dead or Alive starring Steve McQueen in a 1959 episode titled "Man on Horseback."
 
In 1960, she again played Belle Starr in the "Shadow of Jesse James" episode of the TV series Bronco starring Ty Hardin. Cooper made five guest appearances during the nine-year run of CBS's Perry Mason starring Raymond Burr, beginning with the role of Laura Beaumont in the 1958 episode, "The Case of the Corresponding Corpse."  In the final season of the show, she made her fifth and final appearance as defendant Miriam Fielding in the 1966 episode, "The Case of the Vanishing Victim". In 1962, Cooper earned her first Emmy nomination for her performance in Ben Casey. She appeared as a regular on NBC's Bracken's World series about the movie business. She also appeared in episodes of The Twilight Zone, Hawaii Five-O, Mannix, Ironside, Storefront Lawyers, The Silent Force, Touched by an Angel, Gunsmoke, The Untouchables, among numerous other series.

In 1965, she appeared in the ABC network's Western television series The Big Valley as Elaine Baxter Jason, a mercantile store owner and an old friend of series character Victoria Barkley (Barbara Stanwyck). In another episode she appears as the money-hungry aunt of Heath (Lee Majors). Her husband was portrayed in the episode by John Anderson, who years later became known as MacGyver's grandfather, Harry Jackson.

The Young and the Restless
Cooper is best known for her role as Katherine Chancellor on the daytime soap opera The Young and the Restless. Her character broke ground in the daytime medium; Katherine endured several bouts with alcoholism, ischemic stroke, and the loss of many men in her life (four late husbands, and a child given away after birth).

In 1984, Katherine (and Cooper) also had a facelift on national television (Cooper had pitched the idea of having a live facelift to CBS executives, who agreed to write the facelift into the show).
 For many years, the story of Katherine's bitter rivalry with character Jill Foster Abbott was a mainstay of the show (in real life, Cooper and Jill's portrayer, Jess Walton, were close friends). It was revealed in 2003 that Jill was Katherine's daughter born out of wedlock, but developments in 2009 cast doubt upon that assertion and the long-bitter enemies were found not to be mother and daughter after all.

Cooper received ten Daytime Emmy nominations, nine for Outstanding Lead Actress and one for Outstanding Supporting Actress, and two Primetime Emmy nominations. She received a Lifetime Achievement Award from the Daytime Emmys in 2004. For her contributions to television, Cooper received a star on the Hollywood Walk of Fame, which is located at 6801 Hollywood Blvd. She won the 2008 Daytime Emmy Award for Outstanding Lead Actress in a Drama Series. This was her first competitive win; she had first been nominated in 1989.

Cooper's character, Katherine, was thought to have died in a November 2008 episode. It was, however, her look-alike, Marge, who died, and Katherine had experienced memory issues due to the car accident that took Marge's life.

Cooper had to take a medical leave in October 2011 and her part on the soap was temporarily recast with veteran actress Michael Learned. However, the next month, Cooper confirmed she was returning to the set. She returned as part of the show on December 23, 2011. She taped her last scene on the show in March 2013 on the same day as the Young and the Restless 40th anniversary and this scene aired on May 3, 2013, five days before her death.

A tribute episode of The Young and the Restless in honor of Jeanne Cooper, made up of clips, cast memories and interviews, was shown on May 28, 2013 on CBS. Her character, Katherine, died offscreen a few months later after a trip around the world.

Personal life
Cooper married television producer Harry Bernsen, Jr., and they were together for 23 years before divorcing.  In her book (released on July 31, 2012), Cooper makes it known that after their divorce, she and her ex-husband very rarely saw each other (only when family functions dictated) and they were not close or even friends before his death on May 31, 2008. 

The Bernsens had three children, all of whom are actors: Corbin Bernsen of L.A. Law fame (born September 7, 1954), whose mother Cooper portrayed twice on that series; Collin Bernsen, born March 30, 1958; and Caren Bernsen, born August 17, 1960.

Death
In 2013, shortly after a round of promotion for the Y&R 40th anniversary, Cooper became ill due to an infection. She died on May 8, 2013, in a Los Angeles hospital. In addition to the infection, Cooper had been a heavy smoker most of her adult life and suffered from chronic obstructive pulmonary disease. Her final Y&R scene was taped March 26, 2013 (the exact date of Y&R's 40th anniversary) and aired on May 3, 2013. “Mom passed this morning”, her son, Corbin Bernsen, revealed on Twitter the day of her death. “She was in peace and without fear.”

Awards and nominations
 Emmy Award
 1962 — Primetime Emmy Award for Outstanding Supporting Actress in a Drama Series — Ben Casey (Nominated)
 1987 — Primetime Emmy Award for Outstanding Guest Actress in a Drama Series — L.A. Law (Nominated)
 1989 — Daytime Emmy Award for Outstanding Lead Actress in a Drama Series - The Young and the Restless (Nominated)
 1990 — Daytime Emmy Award for Outstanding Lead Actress in a Drama Series - The Young and the Restless (Nominated)
 1991 — Daytime Emmy Award for Outstanding Lead Actress in a Drama Series - The Young and the Restless (Nominated)
 1992 — Daytime Emmy Award for Outstanding Lead Actress in a Drama Series - The Young and the Restless (Nominated)
 1999 — Daytime Emmy Award for Outstanding Lead Actress in a Drama Series - The Young and the Restless (Nominated)
 2000 — Daytime Emmy Award for Outstanding Lead Actress in a Drama Series - The Young and the Restless (Nominated)
 2004 — Lifetime Achievement Award  
 2005 — Daytime Emmy Award for Outstanding Supporting Actress in a Drama Series - The Young and the Restless (Nominated)
 2007 — Daytime Emmy Award for Outstanding Lead Actress in a Drama Series - The Young and the Restless (Nominated)
 2008 — Daytime Emmy Award for Outstanding Lead Actress in a Drama Series - The Young and the Restless (Won)
 2009 — Daytime Emmy Award for Outstanding Lead Actress in a Drama Series - The Young and the Restless (Nominated)
 Hollywood Walk of Fame
 1993 — Star on the Walk of Fame at 6801 Hollywood Blvd.

Filmography

Film

Selected television works

References

External links

 
 Jeanne Cooper bio on The Young and the Restless CBS website
 Jeanne Cooper Obituary

1928 births
2013 deaths
20th-century American actresses
21st-century American actresses
American film actresses
American television actresses
American soap opera actresses
Daytime Emmy Award winners
Daytime Emmy Award for Outstanding Lead Actress in a Drama Series winners
People from Taft, California
Actresses from Los Angeles
Actresses from Bakersfield, California
Western (genre) television actors
Warner Bros. contract players